Sunshine Follows Rain (Swedish: Driver dagg faller regn) is a 1946 Swedish historical drama film directed by Gustaf Edgren and starring Mai Zetterling, Alf Kjellin and Sten Lindgren. The film is based on a 1943 novel by Margit Söderholm.

Söderholm's novel won an award in a competition, and director Gustaf Edgren who had been on the jury wished to make a film out of it. However Carl-Anders Dymling the head of Svensk Filmindustri, was unimpressed with the story and proved very resistant to the project. However, the film turned out to be the company's most profitable of the sound era. The film's sets were designed by the art director Arne Åkermark. It was made at the Filmstaden in Stockholm with some location shooting around Hälsingland where the film is set. It premiered at the Palladium in Stockholm.  It was later released in Germany and Austria by Constantin Film.

Synopsis
In nineteenth century Sweden, a wealthy farmer's daughter engaged to be married, begins a romance with a penniless folk musician.

Cast
 Mai Zetterling as Marit 
 Alf Kjellin as Jon 
 Sten Lindgren as Germund 
 Hilda Borgström as Kerstin 
 Anna Lindahl as Elin, änka på Olsgården 
 Eric von Gegerfelt as Eliasfar
 Tyra Fischer as Eliasmor
 Ulf Palme as Mats, deras son 
 Hugo Hasslo as Knut 
 Inga Landgré as Barbro 
 Ivar Hallbäck as Glabo-Kalle
 Göran Ax as Boy
 Torsten Bergström as Vicar 
 Carl Ström as Forester
 Einar Söderbäck as Nils, Hand

References

Bibliography
 Gunnar Iverson, Astrid Soderbergh Widding & Tytti Soila. Nordic National Cinemas. Routledge, 2005.
 Mariah Larsson. A Cinema of Obsession: The Life and Work of Mai Zetterling. University of Wisconsin Pres, 2020.

External links 
 

1946 films
1940s historical drama films
Swedish historical drama films
1940s Swedish-language films
Films directed by Gustaf Edgren
Films set in the 19th century
Films based on Swedish novels
1946 drama films
1940s Swedish films